Jacques Carbonneau (May 11, 1928 – March 13, 2007) was a Canadian cross-country skier who competed in the 1950s. He finished 70th in the 18 km event at the 1952 Winter Olympics in Oslo.

External links
18 km Olympic cross country results: 1948-52
Jacques Carbonneau's obituary 

Olympic cross-country skiers of Canada
Canadian male cross-country skiers
Cross-country skiers at the 1952 Winter Olympics
1928 births
2007 deaths